Wyoming Highway 194 (WYO 194) is a  east–west State Road in the U.S. state of Wyoming that runs through the community of Story in southern Sheridan County.

Route description
Wyoming Highway 194 travels from an area called Grandma's Mountain and the state fish hatchery west of Story. It travels east into Story, a census-designated place (CDP), intersecting the western terminus of Wyoming Highway 340 (Crooked Street), before turning north at the eastern edge of the community and again east to end at Wyoming Highway 193.

Wyoming Highway 194 lies entirely in Sheridan County, so it is an exception to the numbering rule. The Sheridan County numbering scheme indicates this route should be numbered between 330 and 349.

Major intersections

References

External links 

Wyoming State Routes 100-199
WYO 194 - WYO 193 to WYO 340
WYO 194 - WYO 340 to Story Fish Hatchery
Story, WY website

Transportation in Sheridan County, Wyoming
194